Tom Lewis (7 June 1904–31 May 1994) was a Welsh international number 8 who played club rugby for Cardiff and was capped three times for Wales. Lewis began his rugby career with his local team Pentyrch before being selected to play for first class team Cardiff. He played all his international games whilst with Cardiff and in the 1932/33 season he also captained his club team.

International rugby career
Lewis was first selected to play for Wales in the 1926 Five Nations Championship when he faced England at the Cardiff Arms Park on the 16 January. Lewis was one of 8 new Welsh caps on the day, and the relative inexperienced team, under the captaincy of Rowe Harding, drew 3-3 with the England team. Lewis was dropped for the rest of the tournament, but was back in 1927, again against England, but this time at Twickenham. Wales lost the match 11-9, though the team played with only 14 men for most of the match, when Newports Dai Jones was injured in the first quarter of an hour. Lewis's last game was for Ossie Male's team against Scotland, again in the 1927 Five Nations Championship. Wales lost at home 5-0 and Lewis was never selected for any future games.

International matches played
Wales
  1926, 1927
  1927

Bibliography

References

1904 births
1994 deaths
Cardiff RFC players
Glamorgan County RFC players
Glamorgan Police RFC players
Rugby union number eights
Glamorgan Police officers
Rugby union players from Taff's Well
Wales international rugby union players
Welsh miners
Welsh police officers
Welsh rugby union players